Easter (stylised in all caps) is a German electropop duo of Norwegian vocalist Stine Omar Midtsæter and German Max Boss. The duo was founded in Berlin and published its first album Ur a Great Babe in 2011.

The band's artistic and minimalistic electropop music discusses themes such as sexuality and hedonism through abstract lyrics. The vocalist is recognizable for her "monotone, half-spoken vocals". The band has toured in Europe and Americas.

Discography

Albums 
 Ur a Great Babe (2011)
 The Softest Hard (2012)
 New Cuisine, Pt. 1 (2014)
 New Cuisine, Pt. 2 (2016)
 She is Warm (2019)

References 

German electronic music groups